In philately, a die is the engraved image of a stamp on metal which is subsequently multiplied by impression to create the printing plate (or printing base).

See also
Die proof (philately)

References

External links
The "Old Original" die for the Penny Black.

Philatelic terminology
Printing terminology